Elections to the Baseball Hall of Fame for 1991 followed the system in place since 1978. The Baseball Writers' Association of America (BBWAA) voted by mail to select from recent major league players and elected three, Rod Carew, Ferguson Jenkins, and Gaylord Perry. The Veterans Committee met in closed sessions to consider older major league players as well as managers, umpires, executives, and figures from the Negro leagues. It selected two, Tony Lazzeri and Bill Veeck. A formal induction ceremony was held in Cooperstown, New York, on July 21, 1991.

BBWAA election 

The BBWAA was authorized to elect players active in 1971 or later, but not after 1985; the ballot included candidates from the 1990 ballot who received at least 5% of the vote but were not elected, along with selected players, chosen by a screening committee, whose last appearance was in 1985. All 10-year members of the BBWAA were eligible to vote.

Voters were instructed to cast votes for up to 10 candidates; any candidate receiving votes on at least 75% of the ballots would be honored with induction to the Hall. The ballot consisted of 45 players; a total of 443 ballots were cast, with 333 votes required for election. A total of 2,948 individual votes were cast, an average of 6.65 per ballot. Those candidates receiving less than 5% of the vote will not appear on future BBWAA ballots, but may eventually be considered by the Veterans Committee.

Candidates who were eligible for the first time are indicated here with a dagger (†). The three candidates who received at least 75% of the vote and were elected are indicated in bold italics; candidates who have since been elected in subsequent elections are indicated in italics. The 22 candidates who received less than 5% of the vote, thus becoming ineligible for future BBWAA consideration, are indicated with an asterisk (*).

Jim Bunning and Harvey Kuenn were on the ballot for the 15th and final time.

The field of newly-eligible players included 14 All-Stars, all of whom were on the ballot, representing a total of 58 All-Star selections. Among the new candidates were 18-time All-Star Rod Carew, 7-time All-Stars Rollie Fingers and Al Oliver, 6-time All-Star Rusty Staub, and 5-time All-Stars Larry Bowa and Steve Rogers. The field included four Rookies of the Year (Carew, Al Bumbry, Mike Hargrove and Pat Zachry), three MVPs (Carew, Fingers and Jeff Boroughs) and two Cy Young Award winners (Sparkey Lyle and Rollie Fingers. Fingers also received the MVP Award the same year).

Players eligible for the first time who were not included on the ballot were: Benny Ayala, Alan Bannister, Kurt Bevacqua, Steve Braun, Miguel Diloné, Doug Flynn, Tim Foli, Dan Ford, Kiko Garcia, Ed Glynn, Andy Hassler, Jay Johnstone, Duane Kuiper, Sixto Lezcano, Dan Meyer, Rick Miller, Dale Murray, Joe Nolan, Dan Spillner, Mike Squires, Bill Stein, Derrel Thomas, Rick Waits, and John Wockenfuss.

J. G. Taylor Spink Award 
Phil Collier (1925–2001) received the J. G. Taylor Spink Award honoring a baseball writer. The award was voted at the December 1990 meeting of the BBWAA, and included in the summer 1991 ceremonies.

References

External links 
 1991 Election at www.baseballhallfame.org

Baseball Hall of Fame balloting
Hall of Fame balloting